Hérick Samora da Silva (born January 26, 1987 in Timbuí-ES) is a Brazilian footballer, who currently plays Uberlândia Esporte Clube.

Career
Made full professional debut for Cruzeiro in the 1-4 defeat to Santos on July 7, 2007 in the Campeonato Brasileiro.

References

1987 births
Living people
Brazilian footballers
Cruzeiro Esporte Clube players
Villa Nova Atlético Clube players
Ipatinga Futebol Clube players
Associação Desportiva Cabofriense players
América Futebol Clube (RN) players
Uberlândia Esporte Clube players
Association football defenders